The Interruption of Everything is a 2005 novel written by Terry McMillan.

Plot summary

Marilyn Grimes, a 44-year-old mother of three has spent her time deferring her dreams to create the perfect suburban life for her family: her grown-up children, her live-in mother-in-law, an elderly poodle named Snuffy, and her workaholic husband Leon. She also keeps in touch with her friends (Paulette and Bunny), her aging mother, and her foster sister while juggling a part-time job as an amateur crafts maker. This is a story of a woman who has too much on her plate and nothing to feed her desires and dreams.

See also

References

External links 
 "The Interruption of Everything" at Barnes & Noble

2005 American novels
Novels by Terry McMillan
African-American novels